|}

The Prix Royal-Oak is a Group 1 flat horse race in France open to thoroughbreds aged three years or older. It is run at Longchamp over a distance of 3,100 metres (about 1 mile and 7½ furlongs), and it is scheduled to take place each year in late October.

It is France's equivalent of the St. Leger Stakes, a famous race in England.

History
The event was established in 1861, and it was initially called the Grand Prix du Prince Impérial. It was originally restricted to three-year-olds, and was part of a series of races based on the English Classic system. Its original distance was 3,200 metres.

The race was renamed the Prix Royal-Oak and shortened to 3,000 metres in 1869. It was named after Royal Oak (foaled 1823), a key stallion in the establishment of thoroughbred breeding in France. Due to the Franco-Prussian War, the race was not run in 1870 and 1871.

The Prix Royal-Oak was abandoned throughout World War I, with no running from 1914 to 1918. It was cancelled twice during World War II, in 1939 and 1940. It was staged at Le Tremblay in 1943 and 1944.

The event was extended to 3,100 metres in 1964. The present system of race grading was introduced in 1971, and the Prix Royal-Oak was classed at the highest level, Group 1. For a period it was held in mid-September. It was switched to late October in 1977.

Formerly France's equivalent of the St Leger Stakes in England, the Prix Royal-Oak was opened to horses aged four or older in 1979 and to geldings in 1986. Since then the race has dropped significantly in prestige.

Records
Most successful horse (2 wins):
 Amilynx – 1999, 2000
 Westerner – 2003, 2004
 Tac De Boistron – 2013, 2014
 Vazirabad – 2015, 2016

Leading jockey (6 wins):
 Freddy Head – Dhaudevi (1968), Bourbon (1971), Busiris (1974), Gold River (1980), Agent Double (1984), Top Sunrise (1989)

Leading trainer (7 wins):
 François Mathet – Vamour (1959), Match (1961), Relko (1963), Reliance (1965), Sassafras (1970), Henri le Balafre (1975), Exceller (1976)
 André Fabre – Star Lift (1988), Top Sunrise (1989), Raintrap (1993), Sunshack (1995), Amilynx (1999, 2000), Be Fabulous (2011)

Leading owner (6 wins):
 Frédéric de Lagrange – Palestro (1861), Fille de l'Air (1864), Gladiateur (1865), Nelusco (1868), Inval (1878), Zut (1879)

Winners since 1969

Earlier winners

 1861: Palestro
 1862: Souvenir
 1863: La Toucques
 1864: Fille de l'Air
 1865: Gladiateur
 1866: Etoile Filante
 1867: Patricien
 1868: Nelusco
 1869: Clotho
 1870–71: no race
 1872: Barbillon
 1873: Boiard
 1874: Mignonette
 1875: Perplexe
 1876: Kilt
 1877: Jongleur
 1878: Inval
 1879: Zut
 1880: Beauminet
 1881: Perplexite
 1882: Clio
 1883: Stockholm
 1884: Archiduc
 1885: Escarboucle
 1886: Gamin
 1887: Bavarde
 1888: Galaor
 1889: Pourtant
 1890: Alicante
 1891: Berenger
 1892: Chene Royal
 1893: Ramleh
 1894: Gouvernail
 1895: Bombon
 1896: Champaubert
 1897: Chambertin
 1898: Le Roi Soleil
 1899: Perth
 1900: Ivoire
 1901: Jacobite
 1902: Fer
 1903: Torquato Tasso
 1904: Macdonald II
 1905: Clyde
 1906: Maintenon
 1907: Anemone
 1908: Medeah
 1909: Aveu
 1910: Reinhart
 1911: Combourg
 1912: Gorgorito
 1913: Bruleur
 1914–18: no race
 1919: Stearine
 1920: Embry
 1921: Ksar
 1922: Keror
 1923: Filibert de Savoie
 1924: Uganda
 1925: Priori
 1926: Biribi
 1927: Fiterari
 1928: Cacao
 1929: Calandria
 1930: Taicoun
 1931: Deiri
 1932: Laeken
 1933: Jumbo
 1934: Brantôme
 1935: Bokbul
 1936: Fantastic
 1937: Victrix
 1938: Eclair au Chocolat
 1939–40: no race
 1941: Le Pacha
 1942: Tifinar
 1943: Verso II
 1944: Samaritain
 1945: Caracalla
 1946: Souverain
 1947: Tourment
 1948: Spooney
 1949: Ciel Etoile
 1950: Pan
 1951: Stymphale
 1952: Feu du Diable
 1953: Buisson d'Or
 1954: Sica Boy
 1955: Macip
 1956: Arabian
 1957: Scot
 1958: Wallaby
 1959: Vamour
 1960: Puissant Chef
 1961: Match
 1962: Sicilian Prince
 1963: Relko
 1964: Barbieri
 1965: Reliance
 1966: Vasco de Gama
 1967: Samos
 1968: Dhaudevi

See also
 List of French flat horse races
 Recurring sporting events established in 1861 – this race is included under its original title, Grand Prix du Prince Impérial.

References

 France Galop / Racing Post:
 galop.courses-france.com:
 1861–1889, 1890–1919, 1920–1949, 1950–1979, 1980–present
 france-galop.com – A Brief History: Prix Royal-Oak.
 galopp-sieger.de – Prix Royal-Oak.
 horseracingintfed.com – International Federation of Horseracing Authorities – Prix Royal-Oak (2018).
 pedigreequery.com – Prix Royal-Oak – Longchamp.

Open long distance horse races
Longchamp Racecourse
Horse races in France